Toowoomba North is an electoral district of the Legislative Assembly in the Australian state of Queensland. It was created with the 1972 redistribution. It replaced the abolished electorate of Toowoomba West. Toowoomba North is largely based around the upper half of the city of Toowoomba.

It covers the suburbs north of James Street, including Newtown, Wilsonton, Mount Lofty, etc. It also includes the urban fringe area of Blue Mountain Heights, the satellite town of Highfields and Spring Bluff. It excludes certain western localities of Toowoomba, which are in the Electoral district of Condamine.

The electorate is currently represented by Trevor Watts of the Liberal National Party of Queensland.

Members for Toowoomba North

Election results

References

External links
 

Darling Downs
Toowoomba North
Toowoomba